The Allison Model 250, now known as the Rolls-Royce M250, (US military designations T63 and T703) is a highly successful turboshaft engine family, originally developed by the Allison Engine Company in the early 1960s. The Model 250 has been produced by Rolls-Royce since it acquired Allison in 1995.

Development

In 1958, the Detroit Diesel Allison division of General Motors was chosen by the US Army to develop a new light turbine engine to power a "Light Observation Aircraft" (LOA), to replace the Cessna O-1A Bird Dog. At this stage the US Army was unsure whether to have a fixed- or rotary-wing aircraft, so Allison was instructed to consider both applications. Design studies undertaken considered a wide range of possible mechanical configurations for the turboprop/turboshaft. These studies culminated in the testing of the first prototype engine, designated YT63-A-3, in April 1959. In 1960, the US Army settled for a rotary wing platform. The YT63-A-3 first flew in a variant of the Bell 47 helicopter in 1961. A modified version of the engine (YT63-A-5) with the exhaust pointing upwards (to avoid grass fires) soon followed. This version, rated at 250 hp, passed the Model Qualification Test in September 1962. The Hughes OH-6 design, powered by the T63, was selected for the US Army LOH in May 1965.

The Model 250 powers a large number of helicopters, small aircraft and even a motorcycle (MTT Turbine Superbike).  As a result, nearly 30,000 Model 250 engines have been produced, of which approximately 16,000 remain in service, making the Model 250 one of the highest-selling engines made by Rolls-Royce.

Design

Allison adopted a reverse-airflow engine configuration for the Model 250: although air enters the intake/compression system in the conventional fashion, the compressed air leaving the centrifugal compressor diffuser is ported rearwards via two transfer pipes, which go around the outside of the turbine system, before the air is turned through 180 degrees at entry to the combustor. The combustion products expand axially forward through the two-stage (single-stage on early engines) high-pressure turbine section, which is connected to the compressor via the HP shaft. The combustion products continue to expand through the two-stage power turbine which generates shaft horsepower for the aircraft. A coaxial stub shaft connects the power turbine to a compact reduction gearbox, located inboard, between the centrifugal compressor and the exhaust/power turbine system. The exhaust stream then turns through 90 degrees to exit the engine in a radial direction through twin exhaust ducts, which form a V-shape seen in the front elevation.

An important design feature of the Model 250 engine is its modular construction which greatly simplifies maintenance and repair activity. Also the unique reverse-flow design provides for ease of hot section maintenance. There are four modules:
compressor module, at the front of the engine
gearbox module (including accessory drives)
turbine module (including V-shaped exhaust ports)
combustion module (including twin compressed air transfer ducts) at the rear

Earlier versions have seven axial compressor stages mounted on the HP shaft to supercharge a relatively low-pressure-ratio centrifugal compressor.

One of the latest versions of the Model 250 is the -C40, which has only a centrifugal compressor producing a pressure ratio of 9.2:1, at an airflow of 6.1 lb/s (2.8 kg/s), and develops, at the shaft, .

Variants

250-B15
250-B15A
250-B15C
250-B15G
250-B17
250-B17B
250-B17C
250-B17D
250-B17Fg
250-B17F/1
250-B17F/2
250-C10D
250-C18 
250-C18A 
250-C20
250-C20B
250-C20F
250-C20J 
250-C20R
250-C20R/1
250-C20R/2
250-C20R/4
250-C20S
250-C20W
250-C22B
250-C28
250-C28B
250-C28C
250-C30
250-C30G
250-C30G/2
250-C30M
250-C30P
250-C30R
250-C30R/3
250-C30R/3M
250-C30S
250-C30U
250-C34
250-C40B
250-C47B
250-C47E
250-C47M
250-E3 Experimental engine containing a regenerative heat exchanger. First regenerative engine to fully power a VTOL aircraft in flight. Ran on a Hughes YOH-6A Light Observation Helicopter in 1967.  engine delivering .
T63-A-5
T63-A-5A
T63-A-700 
T63-A-720
T703-AD-700
Soloy Turbine-PacTypically 2x 250-C20S driving a single propeller via a combining gearbox, able to operate individually.
Mitsubishi CT63 Licence production for Kawasaki-Hughes 500 / OH-6A helicopters.

Applications

Fixed-wing

Rotary-wing

Other applications
 Loral GZ-22, non-rigid airship
 MTT Turbine Superbike, motorcycle

Specifications Model 250-C18 (T63-A-700)

See also

References

External links

 Rolls-Royce M250 Official page
 Video of running model

1960s turboprop engines
Model 250
1960s turboshaft engines
M250